Raghab Bandyopadhyay (14 November 1948 – 8 February 2017) was an Indian Bengali prose writer and columnist.

Life
Raghab was born on 14 November 1948 at Bhawanipore in Kolkata, one year after India's Independence. Brought up in north Kolkata, he came in touch with rural Bengal in the late 60s by virtue of his close association with the Naxalite movement. About this time he started writing. In 1970, he was arrested and spent three years in jail. This experience was reflected in his first novel, Komunis. The publication of Komunis got an encouraging reaction from intellectuals including Ashok Rudra and Malini Bhattacharya. In the late 1970s and in 1980s, Raghab Bandyopadhyay continued publishing. His works of the period include Baadar galpo, a collection of short stories, and his second novel Shaishab. During this time Raghab also began his career as a professional journalist. Since his retirement in 2007 he has been heading a publishing house named Charchapada Publication Private Limited. He also edits a half-yearly Bengali magazine called Charcha alongside.

Works

Collection of stories
 Akaalbodhan O Anyanya Galpo
 Badar galpo
 Angshagrahan
 Galpo 33
 Ashmani Katha: Uchchheder 5 Kahon
 Galpo Sangraha
 Daladas

Novels
 Komunis
 Shoishab
 Tahara
 Mudran soundarya
 Sahar sanskaran
 Satik jadunagar
 Chor Challisha
 Medhabi Bhut O Madhabilata
 Operation Rajarhat
 Kata jibher brittanta
 Raktajaba rahasya

Contribution in edited volumes
 Memory's Gold, Writings on Calcutta, edited by Amit Chaudhuri, Penguin Viking, 2008.
 Calcutta The Living City, Vol:2, edited by Sukanta Chaudhuri, Oxford University Press, 1990.

Special issue on Raghab Bandyopadhyay
 Kathak, edited by Shatadal Mitra, January 2012. Some of the contributors are Dipesh Chakrabarty, Ashok Sen, Debesh Roy, Hiran Mitra, Swapan Chakrabarty, Pradip Basu, Sanjoy Mukhopadhyay, Sumita Chakrabarty, Ranabir Lahiri, Nabarun Bhattacharya, Debarshi Talukdar.

Essays
 Kamalkumar Kolkata: Pichhutaaner itihas
 Marjiner Lekha Lekhar Marjine

Journalistic and other writings
 Banglar mukh
 Babu Bibi o Tahara
 Prantojaner Katha
 Journal 70

References

External links
Raghab Bandyopadhyay's Charchapada webpage
Featured Author at the 3rd Norman Cutler Conference on South Asian Literature at the University of Chicago
Memory’s Gold book review
Memory’s Gold: Writings on Calcutta review
Charchapada book release: Raghab Bandyopadhyay with Ashok Mitra and Mihir Bhattacharya at the launch of Kamalkumar Majumdar’s essays
An article on Charchapada
Another article on Charchapada
Book Release: Chhoy Ritur Gaan
Book Release: Comunis O Onyanyo
An article on Operation Rajarhat as Editorial on page 4 of Sakalbela
Obituary on Ei Samay
Obituary on Ajkaal
Obituary on Anandabazar Patrika
Review of Raktajaba rahasya by Gautam Bhadra on Anandabazar Patrika
Obituary on Economic and Political Weekly

1948 births
2017 deaths
Bengali novelists
Writers from Kolkata
Novelists from West Bengal
20th-century Indian novelists
21st-century Indian novelists
Poets from West Bengal
20th-century Indian poets
21st-century Indian poets